Bar Kokhba is a double album by John Zorn, recorded between 1994 and 1996. It features music from Zorn's Masada project, rearranged for small ensembles. It also features the original soundtrack from The Art of Remembrance – Simon Wiesenthal, a film by Hannah Heer and Werner Schmiedel (1994–95).

Reception 
The AllMusic review by Marc Gilman noted: "While some compositions retain their original structure and sound, some are expanded and probed by Zorn's arrangements, and resemble avant-garde classical music more than jazz. But this is the beauty of the album; the ensembles provide a forum for Zorn to expand his compositions. The album consistently impresses."

Track listing 
All compositions by John Zorn
Disc One
 "Gevurah" – 6:55
 "Nezikin" – 1:51
 "Mahshav" – 4:33
 "Rokhev" – 3:10
 "Abidan" – 5:19
 "Sheloshim" – 5:03
 "Hath-Arob" – 2:25
 "Paran" – 4:48
 "Mahlah" – 7:48
 "Socoh" – 4:07
 "Yechida" – 8:24
 "Bikkurim" – 3:25
 "Idalah-Abal" – 5:04
Disc Two
 "Tannaim" – 4:38
 "Nefesh" – 3:33
 "Abidan" – 3:13
 "Mo'ed" – 4:59
 "Maskil" – 4:41
 "Mishpatim" – 6:46
 "Sansanah" – 6:56
 "Shear-Jashub" – 2:06
 "Mahshav" – 4:50
 "Sheloshim" – 6:45
 "Mochin" – 13:11
 "Karaim" – 3:39
Recorded at Baby Monster Studios, New York City in August 1994, December 1995 and March 1996

Personnel 
 John Zorn – Producer
 Mark Feldman (2,4,6,10,12,14,16,20,21,25) – violin
 Erik Friedlander (2,4,6,10,12,14,16,21,25) – cello
 Greg Cohen (2,4,6,9,10,12,14,16,18,21,25) – bass
 Marc Ribot (9,18,24) – guitar
 Anthony Coleman (1,3,11,17,19) – piano
 David Krakauer (3,8) – clarinets
 John Medeski (5,7,8,13,15,17,20,22,23) – organ, piano
 Mark Dresser (1,15,19) – bass
 Kenny Wollesen (1,2,15,19,23) – drums
 Chris Speed (5,13,20,23) – clarinet
 Dave Douglas (23) – trumpet

References 

1996 albums
Tzadik Records albums
Albums produced by John Zorn
Bar Kokhba albums
Jewish music albums